"The Cut-Glass Bowl" is a short story by American author F. Scott Fitzgerald, first published in the May 1920 issue of Scribner's Magazine, and included later that year in his first short story collection Flappers and Philosophers. The story follows the lives of a married couple, Evylyn and Harold Piper, through various difficult or tragic events that involve a cut glass bowl they received as a wedding gift. In a copy of  Flappers and Philosophers which he gave to literary critic H. L. Mencken, Fitzgerald wrote that he deemed the story to be "worth reading" in contrast to others in the volume which he dismissed as either "amusing" or "trash."

Plot summary 

Mrs. Roger Fairboalt, an elderly gossip, visits the younger Evylyn Piper at her home. The older woman is a snoop who is curious about Mrs. Piper and her rumored affair with Freddy Gedney. They discuss the furnishings in the house, including the china. Mrs. Fairboalt focuses on a large cut-glass bowl. Evelyn explains that it was a wedding gift from a friend, someone she saw socially before she married. When he gave it to her, he exclaimed: "Evylyn, I'm going to give a present that's as hard as you are and as beautiful and as empty and as easy to see through." 

After Mrs. Fairboalt's departure, Freddy Gedney surreptitiously approaches the house, and Evylyn informs him that she is ending their extramarital affair. Her husband Harold Piper arrives home early. She conceals Freddy, but he hits the cut-glass bowl revealing his presence to Harold. Following the discovery of Evylyn's adultery, the marriage becomes strained thereafter, and Evylyn focuses on raising their two children. She begins to noticeably age.

On Evylyn's thirty-fifth birthday, her alcoholic husband Harold calls and tells her they are having guests for dinner—a business dinner with a potential partner and his wife to discuss a merger of their companies. Harold insists using the cut-glass bowl for the punch. Everyone becomes inebriated at dinner, and Evylyn's daughter cuts her hand on the bowl and develops blood poisoning. Her hand is amputated.

After this incident, Evylyn receives a letter with news of her son's death in World War I, which the maid has placed in the bowl. She reads the letter next to the bowl. In grief and despair, she takes the bowl outside the house but, as she descends the stairs, she falls and the bowl shatters into pieces.

List of characters 
Evylyn Piper - A beautiful young housewife in the early 1900s.
Harold Piper - Evylyn's husband, a prosperous wholesale hardware house owner.
Freddy Gedney - Evylyn's love affair.
Donald and Julie - Children of Evylyn and Harold.
Milton Piper - Harold's younger brother and partner.
Jessie Lowrie - Harold's first cousin (née Jessie Piper).
Tom Lowrie - Jessie's husband.
Irene Piper - Harold's unmarried sister.
Joe Ambler - "A confirmed bachelor and Irene's perennial beau".
Mrs Roger Fairboalt - Old friend of Evylyn.
Carleton Canby - Old friend of Evylyn, the one who gives her the cut-glass bowl, back in 1890s.
Clarence Ahearn - A potential partner of Harold and Milton in the hardware business.
Mrs Ahearn - Clarence's wife.
Hilda and Martha - Maids.
Dr Martin and Dr Foulke - Physicians.
Bijou - Evylyn's pony when a young girl.

Background and composition 

Fitzgerald wrote the story in October 1919. Although ostensibly an analysis of the role played by an enormous glass punch bowl in the destruction of the life of Evylyn Piper, much of the short story traces the deterioration of Evylyn's marriage to a prosperous hardware dealer whose business declines over the course of several years.

References

Citations

Works cited

External links 

 Scribner's Magazine — Volume 67, No. 5 — "The Cut-Glass Bowl" (Library of America)
 Scribner's Magazine — Volume 67, No. 5 — "The Cut-Glass Bowl" (Modernist Journals Project)
 

Short stories by F. Scott Fitzgerald
1920 short stories
1920s short stories
American short stories
Works originally published in Scribner's Magazine